Nathalie Wunderlich (born 3 June 1971) is a Swiss backstroke and medley swimmer. She competed in three events at the 1992 Summer Olympics.

References

External links
 

1971 births
Living people
Swiss female backstroke swimmers
Swiss female medley swimmers
Olympic swimmers of Switzerland
Swimmers at the 1992 Summer Olympics
Place of birth missing (living people)
20th-century Swiss women